Golden Heart Farm is a private residence in the hamlet of Bolton Landing, New York, in the United States. It served as the art colony of Thomas and Weber Furlong from 1921 to 1962. Artists from Manhattan came to the art colony to study with Wilhelmina Weber Furlong of the Art Students League of New York

History
Warren Counties Golden Heart Farm was the residence of the Thomas and Wilhelmina Weber Furlong. The artist chose the name for her colony while living in New York City. Thomas Furlong was an accomplished muralist and realist painter. His wife Wilhelmina Weber Furlong was a major American modern artist. The farm house was built in the 1860s by Rufus Randall, a veteran of the Civil War, upon his return home. Randall cleared and farmed the land and raised his family there before selling the property to another Bolton man, Edson Persons. The farm was reputed to have “one of the most magnificent views of the lake in the vicinity,” according to a newspaper clipping from 1961.

References

External links
 The lake George Mirror Tales From Golden Heart Part One
 The lake George Mirror Tales from Golden Heart, Part Three: Documenting the Life and Times of Bolton Artist Weber Furlong
 Detailed description of the Max Weber papers, 1902-2008 ...
 Detailed description of the Dorothy Dehner papers, 1920 ...
 Oral history interviews with Dorothy Dehner, 1965 Oct.-1966 ...
 The Weber Furlong Foundation 

Buildings and structures in Warren County, New York
Artist colonies